Milind Ingle is a singer and music director from Pen, Maharashtra, India.

Career
Milind's songs are mainly in Marathi and Hindi. Milind collaborated with poet/lyricist Soumitra (Kishor Kadam)for his album, Gaarva (गारवा) meaning "cool" (as in breeze), in Marathi. It is a compilation of six songs (plus one reprise) that describe the advent of the monsoon after a scorching summer. Each song is preceded by Soumitra's poetry, narrated by the poet himself.

The market success of Gaarva prompted the music director/singer/lyricist team to create a second one soon after, titled Saanj Gaarva (सांज गारवा), or "the evening breeze". The poetry reading precedes each song, this time by noted Marathi actor, Sachin Khedekar.

Discography

Tuzya Tapor Dolyat Majhe Evlas Gaon (Marathi) 
 "Bhardar Kaya"
 "Galavar Bat"
 "Gol Gol Gaal"
 "Kajal"
 "Oth"
 "Naak"
 "Kasa Bolava Ughada"
 Others

Gaarva (Marathi) 
 "Gaarva"
 "Rimjhim Dhun"
 "Gaar Vara Haa Bharaaraa"
 "Zaadaakhaali Basalele"
 "Paaus Daatalela"
 "Punha Pavsaalaach Saangayche"
 "Gaarva (Pavasanantarcha)"

Saanj Gaarva (Marathi) 
 "Ha Asa Saanjgaarva"
 "Bhet Maajhi Tujhi"
 "Kadhi Saanjveli"
 "Eke Diwashi Sandhyakali"
 "Aathvanichya Phulani Jase"
 "Paaus Daatalela"
 "Dis Nakalat Jaai"

Yeh Hai Prem – 1998 (Hindi) 
Singer & Music Director – Milind M. Ingle
Lyrics – Shyam Anuragi
Supporting Singer – Shikha
Featuring – Abbas & Preeti Jhangiani
Video Director – Kunal Kohli
Video Producer – Rajat Bharjatiya 

Audio CD Tracks
1. "Chhuimui Si Tum Lagti Ho"
2. "Yeh Hai Prem"
3. "Kudi Jach Gayi"
4. "Kabse Tera Hai Intezaar"
5. "Meri Juliet Meri Sahiba"
6. "Rimjhim Barso Megh"
7. "Tu Ru Ru"
8. " Main Tumhe Chaha Karun"
9. "You Are The One"
10."O Priya"

References

External links
 Official website

Year of birth missing (living people)
Living people
Indian male singers
Marathi-language singers
People from Raigad district